The United States national U-19 American football team represents the United States in under-19 international American football competitions.
The US has competed in all 5 of the IFAF Junior World Championship competitions in which they finished in First Place 2 times, Second Place 2 times, and Third Place 1 time. The US has also won the IFAF International Bowl 7 times. They are currently ranked no.2 in the IFAF U-19 rankings. Top competitions for the U-19s are the IFAF Junior World Championship, IFAF International Bowl, and U-19 North American Championships.

Many top NFL players have gone through the U-19 National team, including Chase Young, Jameis Winston, Mac Jones, Dwayne Haskins, Todd Gurley, Trevon Diggs, and Mecole Hardman

Honors

Competitive
IFAF Junior World Championship
 Champions (2): 2009, 2014
 Runners-up (2): 2012, 2016
 Third Place (1): 2018 

International Bowl
 Champions (7): 2014, 2015, 2016, 2017, 2018, 2019, 2020

North American Championship
 Champions (1): 2018 

NFL Global Junior Championship
 Champions (4): 2001, 2002, 2003, 2004
 Runners-up (3): 2005, 2006, 2007
 Third Place (1): 2000

Results

NFL Global Junior Championship
 2000 Third Place
 2001 Champions
 2002 Champions
 2003 Champions
 2004 Champions
 2005 Runner-Up
 2006 Runner-Up
 2007 Runner-Up

IFAF Junior World Championship
2009 IFAF Junior World Cup Champions: 41-3 Vs. Canada
2012 IFAF U-19 World Championship Runners Up: 17-23 Vs. Canada
2014 IFAF U-19 World Championship Champions: 40-17 Vs. Canada
2016 IFAF U-19 World Championship Runners Up: 6-24 Vs. Canada
2018 IFAF U-19 World Championship Third Place: 61-9 Vs. Sweden

International Bowl
2014 Champions 43-7 Vs. Canada
2015 Champions 35-0 Vs. Canada
2016 Champions 33-0 Vs. Canada
2017 Champions 33-11 Vs. Canada
2018 Champions 47-7 Vs. Canada
2019 Champions 50-0 Vs. Tamaulipas
2020 Champions 67-0 Vs Panama

North American Championship
2018 Champions 33-11 Vs. Canada

Select team
The US National team also fields a Select team at the U-19 level. The U-19 select team competes at the International Bowl every year.

Select Team International Bowl Records
2016 Runners up 31-13 Vs. Canada
2018 Champions 48-13 Vs. Team Nordic
2019 Champions 53-0 Vs. Nuevo Leon

Rivals

Canada
The U-19's biggest rival is the Canada men's national football team. These 2 teams are widely considered as the two major powerhouses at the U-19 level, with all the U-19 World Championships being won between the two teams. The US leads the all time series 14-6.

Panama
In recent years the US has developed a rivalry with Panama

See also

National men's under-19 American football teams
American football